The Women's 3 m synchro springboard competition of the 2022 European Aquatics Championships was held on 18 August 2022.

Results

The final was started at 15:30.

References

Diving